Love Me No More may refer to:

 Love Me No More (film), a 2008 French film
 "Love Me No More" (Jim Jones song), a song from the album Harlem's American Gangster